Pietro "Pete" Rugolo (December 25, 1915 – October 16, 2011) was an American jazz composer, arranger and record producer.

Life and career
Rugolo was born in San Piero Patti, Sicily. His family emigrated to the United States in 1920 and settled in Santa Rosa, California. He began his career in music playing the baritone horn, like his father, but he quickly branched out into other instruments, notably the French horn and the piano. He received a bachelor's degree from San Francisco State College and then went on to study composition with Darius Milhaud at Mills College in Oakland, California and earn his master's degree.

After he graduated, he was hired as an arranger and composer by guitarist and bandleader Johnny Richards. He spent World War II playing with altoist Paul Desmond in an Army band. After the war, Rugolo worked for Stan Kenton. He and songwriter Joe Greene collaborated on songs that made Kenton's band one of America's most popular.

While Rugolo continued to work occasionally with Kenton in the 1950s, he spent more time creating arrangements for pop and jazz vocalists, most extensively with former Kenton singer June Christy on such albums as Something Cool, The Misty Miss Christy, Fair and Warmer!, Gone for the Day, and The Song Is June!

During this period, he worked on film musicals at Metro-Goldwyn-Mayer, and in the late 1950s he served as an A&R director for Mercury Records. Among his albums were Adventures in Rhythm, Introducing Pete Rugolo, Rugolomania, An Adventure in Sound: Reeds in Hi-Fi, and Music for Hi-Fi Bugs. Rugolo's arrangements for the album The Four Freshmen and Five Trombones propelled the group to recognition in jazz circles. It was their bestselling album.

Television and film scoring
In the 1960s and 1970s, Rugolo did a great deal of work in television, contributing music to a number of series including Leave It to Beaver, Thriller, The Investigators, The Thin Man, Checkmate, The Fugitive, Run for Your Life, Felony Squad, The Bold Ones: The Lawyers, Alias Smith and Jones and Family.

He provided scores for a number of TV movies and a few theatrical films, such as Jack the Ripper (1959), The Sweet Ride (1968), Underground Aces (1981) and Chu Chu and the Philly Flash (1981).

In 1962, he released an album of themes from popular television series, TV's Top Themes, which included his composition for the 1961 CBS sitcom Ichabod and Me. Rugolo's small combo jazz music featured in a couple of numbers in the film Where the Boys Are (1960) under the guise of Frank Gorshin's "Dialectic Jazz Band".

Death
Rugolo died at the age of 95 on October 16, 2011 in Sherman Oaks, California.

Discography
 Introducing Pete Rugolo (Columbia, 1954)
 Adventures in Rhythm (Columbia, 1955)
 Rugolomania (Columbia, 1955)
 Music for Hi-Fi Bugs (EmArcy, 1956)
 Out on a Limb (EmArcy, 1956)
 New Sounds by Pete Rugolo (Harmony, 1957)
 An Adventure in Sound: Reeds in Hi-Fi (Mercury, 1958)
 An Adventure in Sound: Brass in Hi-Fi (Mercury, 1958)
 Percussion at Work (Mercury, 1958)
 Rugolo Plays Kenton (EmArcy, 1958)
 The Music from Richard Diamond (EmArcy, 1959)
 Behind Brigitte Bardot (Warner Bros., 1960)
 10 Trombones Like 2 Pianos (Mercury, 1960)
 The Original Music of Thriller (Time, 1961)
 Ten Trumpets and 2 Guitars (Mercury, 1961)
 10 Saxophones and 2 Basses (Mercury, 1961)
 TV's Top Themes (Mercury, 1962)

As conductor/arranger
With Nat King Cole
"Lush Life" (Capitol, 1949) 
 The Nat King Cole Trio Vol. 4 (Capitol, 1949)
 "Frosty the Snowman" (Capitol, 1950)
 10th Anniversary Album (Capitol, 1948–1953 [1955])
 The Nat King Cole Story (Capitol, 1961)

With June Christy
Something Cool (Capitol, 1955)
The Misty Miss Christy (Capitol, 1956)
Fair and Warmer! (Capitol, 1957)
Gone for the Day (Capitol, 1957)
This Is June Christy! (Capitol, 1958)
The Song Is June! (Capitol, 1958)
Recalls Those Kenton Days (Capitol, 1959)
Off-Beat (Capitol, 1960)
This Time of Year (Capitol, 1961)

With Robert Clary
Gigi (Mercury, 1958)

With Buddy Collette
Buddy Collette's Swinging Shepherds (EmArcy, 1958)
At the Cinema! (Mercury, 1959)

With The Diamonds
The Diamonds Meet Pete Rugolo (Mercury, 1958)

With Vernon Duke
Time Remembered (Mercury, 1957)

With Billy Eckstein
Billy Eckstine's Imagination (EmArcy, 1958)

With The Four Freshmen
Four Freshmen and 5 Trombones (Capitol, 1955)
Four Freshmen and Five Saxes (Capitol, 1957)
Voices in Latin (Capitol, 1957)
Voices and Brass (Capitol, 1960)
More 4 Freshmen and 5 Trombones (Capitol, 1964)

With Paul Horn 
House of Horn (Dot, 1957)

With Stan Kenton
Stan Kenton's Milestones (Capitol, 1943-47 [1950])
Stan Kenton Classics (Capitol, 1944-47 [1952])
Artistry in Rhythm (Capitol, 1946)
Encores (Capitol, 1947)
A Presentation of Progressive Jazz (Capitol, 1947)
Popular Favorites by Stan Kenton (Capitol, 1953)
Kenton in Hi-Fi (Capitol, 1956)
Lush Interlude (Capitol, 1958)
Artistry in Voices and Brass (Capitol, 1963)

With Ruth Olay
Olay! The New Sound of Ruth Olay (Mercury, 1959)

With Patti Page
In the Land of Hi-Fi (Mercury, 1956)
The East Side (Mercury, 1957)
The West Side (Mercury, 1959)

Film and television scores
The Strip (1951)
The Stranger (1954)
The Thin Man (1958–59)
Jack the Ripper (1959) 
Richard Diamond, Private Detective (1959)
Private Property (1960)
Where the Boys Are (1960)
The Tab Hunter Show (1960–61)
Thriller (1960–61)
My Three Sons (1961)
General Electric Theater (1961)
Ichabod and Me (1961)
The Investigators (1961)
Checkmate (1961–62)
The Untouchables (1962)
87th Precinct (1962)
Leave It to Beaver (1962–63)
The Alfred Hitchcock Hour (1962–63)
Arrest and Trial (1963)
The Virginian (1963)
The Richard Boone Show (1963)
The Fugitive (1963–67)
A French Honeymoon (1964)
Many Happy Returns (1964–65)
Kraft Suspense Theatre (1964–65)
Two's Company (1965)
Run for Your Life (1965–68)
Blue Light (1966)
Horatio Alger Jones (1966)
Felony Squad (1966–69)
Off to See the Wizard (1967)
Vacation Playhouse (1967)
Lost in Space (1968)
The Sweet Ride (1968)
The Outsider (1968)
The Sound of Anger (1968)
The Whole World Is Watching (1969)
The Lonely Profession (1969)
The Bold Ones: The Lawyers (1969–72)
The Young Country (1970)
The Challengers (1970)
Don Knotts' Nice Clean, Decent, Wholesome Hour (1970)
Alias Smith and Jones (1971–72)
How to Steal an Airplane (1971)
The Death of Me Yet (1971)
Who Killed the Mysterious Mr. Foster? (1971)
Do You Take This Stranger? (1971)
Sanford and Son (1972)
Hawaii Five-O (1972)
Cool Million (1972)
The Rookies (1972 & 1974)
Toma (1973)
The Letters (1973)
Set This Town on Fire (1973)
Letters from Three Lovers (1973)
Drive Hard, Drive Fast (1973)
Movin' On (1974)
Police Woman (1974)
The Story of Pretty Boy Floyd (1974)
Death Cruise (1974)
Death Stalk (1975)
Last Hours Before Morning (1975)
The Blue Knight (1975)
M*A*S*H (1975)
The Invisible Man (1975)
Foxtrot (1976)
The Far Side of Paradise (1976)
Jigsaw John (1976)
Family (1976-1979)
The San Pedro Bums (1977)
Kingston: Confidential (1977)
Carter Country (1977)
The Jordan Chance (1978)
The Last Convertible (1979)
Underground Aces (1981)
Revenge of the Gray Gang (1981)
Chu Chu and the Philly Flash (1981)
For Lovers Only (1981)
O'Malley (1983)
Fantasy Island (1983)
Blue Thunder (1984)
This World, Then the Fireworks (1997)

See also
 List of jazz arrangers

References

External links
 

1915 births
2011 deaths
Italian emigrants to the United States
American film score composers
American jazz composers
American jazz musicians
American music arrangers
American record producers
American television composers
Big band bandleaders
Jazz arrangers
Jazz record producers
American male film score composers
American male jazz composers
Male television composers
Mercury Records artists
Pupils of Darius Milhaud
United States Army personnel of World War II
United States Army Band musicians
People from San Piero Patti